Matteo Meggiato (born 10 December 2001) is an Italian rugby union player, currently playing for Italian United Rugby Championship side Benetton and. on loan, with Top10 team Mogliano. His preferred position is flanker.

In January 2020, Meggiato was named in the Italy Under 20 squad for the 2020 Six Nations Under 20s Championship. On 8 November 2021 he was named in the Italy A squad for the 2021 end-of-year rugby union internationals
and on 8 December he was named in Emerging Italy 27-man squad also for the 2021 end-of-year rugby union internationals.

References

External links
itsrugby.co.uk Profile

2001 births
Living people
Italian rugby union players
Benetton Rugby players
Mogliano Rugby players
Rugby union flankers